The mixed team competition of the ski jumping events at the 2012 Winter Youth Olympics in Innsbruck, Austria, was held on January 21, at the Toni-Seelos-Olympiaschanze. Each of the 13 teams consists of a female ski jumper, a male Nordic Combined skier and a male ski jumper.

Results 
The first round was started on 21 January at 14:30 and the final round at 15:00.

References 

Ski jumping at the 2012 Winter Youth Olympics